Folsom is a city in Sacramento County, California, United States. It is commonly known for Folsom State Prison, the song "Folsom Prison Blues" by Johnny Cash, as well as for Folsom Lake. The population was 80,454 at the 2020 census.

Folsom is part of the Sacramento−Arden-Arcade−Roseville Metropolitan Statistical Area.

History
Folsom is named for Joseph Libbey Folsom who purchased Rancho Rio de los Americanos from the heirs of San Francisco merchant William Alexander Leidesdorff, and laid out the town called Granite City, mostly occupied by gold miners seeking their fortune in the Sierra Nevada foothills. Though few amassed a great deal of wealth, the city prospered due to Joseph Folsom's lobbying to get a railway to connect the town with Sacramento. Joseph died in 1855, and Granite City was later renamed Folsom in his honor. The railway was abandoned in the 1980s but opened up as the terminus of the Gold Line of Sacramento Regional Transit District's light rail service in 2005. A few former gold-rush era towns are located within the city limits of Folsom, including Prairie City, Salmon Falls, and Mormon Island (though these towns no longer exist).

Folsom hosted a significant Chinese American community when it was first incorporated, but arsonists burned Folsom's Chinatown in March 1886, driving Chinese Americans out of town.

The establishment of Folsom Prison came in 1880, when the Livermore family made an agreement with the state to donate land for the prison in exchange for prison labor. They planned to build a hydro-electric dam from the American River for a sawmill. Though the sawmill did not work out, the Livermores soon realized that the natural force of running water could provide enough power to transmit to Sacramento, and the Folsom Powerhouse, now a National Historic Landmark, was opened. At the time it was opened, it had the longest overhead run of electricity (22 miles) in the country. The powerhouse operated until 1952.

Folsom Dam was built in 1956, providing flood control and water rights for the Sacramento Valley and created Folsom Lake. The dam is located on the southwest corner of the lake. The lake is an estimated  from Granite Bay to the most southern point of Folsom Lake.

In addition to  Folsom Dam and   Folsom Prison, Folsom is home to Folsom Lake College, Folsom High School, Vista del Lago High School and a historic downtown district. Folsom is also home to the largest private employer in the Sacramento area, Intel.

The plan allows the construction of 11,000 homes resulting in 25,000 additional residents enlarging the city of Folsom by one-third.

Geography
Folsom is located in the foothills of the Sierra Nevada.

Folsom's climate is characterized by long, hot, dry summers and cool, rainy winters.

Demographics

2010
At the 2010 census Folsom had a population of 72,203. The racial makeup of Folsom was 53,627 (74.3%) White, 4,140 (5.7%) African American, 427 (0.6%) Native American, 9,000 (12.5%) Asian, 173 (0.2%) Pacific Islander, 1,818 (2.5%) from other races, and 3,018 (4.2%) from two or more races. Hispanic or Latino of any race were 8,064 persons (11.2%).

The census reported that 65,243 people (90.4% of the population) lived in households, 188 (0.3%) lived in non-institutionalized group quarters, and 6,772 (9.4%) were institutionalized.

There were 24,951 households, 9,796 (39.3%) had children under the age of 18 living in them, 14,399 (57.7%) were opposite-sex married couples living together, 2,195 (8.8%) had a female householder with no husband present, 1,006 (4.0%) had a male householder with no wife present.  There were 1,150 (4.6%) unmarried opposite-sex partnerships, and 137 (0.5%) same-sex married couples or partnerships. 5,788 households (23.2%) were one person and 1,930 (7.7%) had someone living alone who was 65 or older. The average household size was 2.61.  There were 17,600 families (70.5% of households); the average family size was 3.13.

The age distribution was 17,570 people (24.3%) under the age of 18, 5,344 people (7.4%) aged 18 to 24, 23,022 people (31.9%) aged 25 to 44, 19,358 people (26.8%) aged 45 to 64, and 6,909 people (9.6%) who were 65 or older.  The median age was 37.6 years. For every 100 females, there were 114.1 males.  For every 100 females age 18 and over, there were 117.9 males.

There were 26,109 housing units at an average density of 1,074.4 per square mile, of the occupied units 17,442 (69.9%) were owner-occupied and 7,509 (30.1%) were rented. The homeowner vacancy rate was 1.9%; the rental vacancy rate was 5.2%.  47,982 people (66.5% of the population) lived in owner-occupied housing units and 17,261 people (23.9%) lived in rental housing units.

2000
At the 2000 census there were 51,884 people in 17,196 households, including 12,518 families, in the city. The racial makeup of the city was 77.89% Caucasian, 5.99% African American, 0.58% Native American, 7.19% Asian, 0.19% Pacific Islander, 4.71% from other races, and 3.43% from two or more races. Hispanic or Latino of any race were 9.47%.

Of the 17,196 households 39.1% had children under the age of 18 living with them, 61.7% were married couples living together, 8.0% had a female householder with no husband present, and 27.2% were non-families. 21.8% of households were one person and 7.1% were one person aged 65 or older.  The average household size was 2.61 and the average family size was 3.08.

The age distribution was 24.2% under the age of 18, 6.6% from 18 to 24, 39.0% from 25 to 44, 21.4% from 45 to 64, and 8.8% 65 or older.  The median age was 36 years. For every 100 females, there were 123.4 males.  For every 100 females age 18 and over, there were 131.0 males.

According to a 2007 estimate, The median household income was $87,542, and the median family income  was $109,032. Males had a median income of $60,616 versus $42,434 for females. The per capita income for the city was $30,210.  About 2.6% of families and 7.3% of the population were below the poverty line, including 4.1% of those under age 18 and 4.3% of those age 65 or over.

Government

In February 2020, 75 project customers, including the City of Folsom, received permanent federal water contracts for the Central Valley Project.

Public safety
Folsom is protected by the Folsom Police Department and the Folsom Fire Department. The police department is a full service agency with Operations, Administration, and Investigations Division. The Patrol Bureau of the Operations Division consists of patrol, traffic, canines, bicycles, SWAT and school resource officers. The Investigations Bureau investigates persons, property, juvenile services and narcotics.

The police are augmented by a reserve officer program, an explorer scout program, and an award-winning volunteer program named Citizen's Assisting Public Safety (CAPS).

Folsom experiences a very low crime rate, a majority of which are property crimes. The FBI's Uniformed Crime Report consistently shows Folsom as one of the lowest crime rates in the State of California. Both the Folsom Police Department and Folsom Fire Department utilize Nixle.com, Facebook, and Twitter to keep residents and business owners informed of emergencies and crime trends.

Economy

Top employers
According to the city's 2020 Comprehensive Annual Financial Report, the top employers in the city are:

The total Folsom labor force is 35,500. Approximately 59.6% of the total adult population asset, of around 59,740.

Sports and Recreation

Parks
Livermore Community Park is located in Folsom and offers a bike trail, sports facilities and a water park.

Bike Trails
Folsom is home to 32 miles of bike trails including the Humbug-Willow Creek Trail. This particular trail system follows both Humbug and Willow Creeks, and passes through several traces of dredge tailings and riparian forests. Other trails include the Folsom Rail Trail (along Folsom Boulevard), The Folsom Lake Trail (to connect El Dorado Hills with Lake Natoma), and the Oak Parkway Trail (between Blue Ravine Road and East Natoma Street).

Folsom is also the endpoint of the American River Bike Trail, which starts in Sacramento.

Folsom also has a small bike trail that also caters to pedestrians, that extends from Walden Drive to Clarksville Road. This is located in proximity to the local sports club Broadstone Sports Club, formerly Broadstone Racquet club. 

Folsom Lake Recreational Area has several off-road biking and hiking trails. A few of the more popular trails include the American River Trail, Pioneer Express Trail, Sweetwater Trail, Darrington Trail, and Granite Bay Trails. These more strenuous hiking and mountain biking trails overlook Folsom Lake and range from 2 miles to more than 20 miles long.

Bridges
Bridges located in Folsom include the Lake Natoma Crossing; the Rainbow Bridge, a historic truss bridge; and Folsom Lake Crossing. There is also a pedestrian bridge over East Bidwell Street that opened on November 6, 2010, as part of a new segment on the Humbug-Willow Creek Trail called the Johnny Cash Trail and a Johnny Cash Bridge crossing over near the intersection of Folsom Lake Crossing and East Natoma that was unveiled on October 4, 2014.

Government and infrastructure
The California Department of Corrections and Rehabilitation prisons Folsom State Prison and California State Prison, Sacramento are located in Folsom.

The United States Postal Service operates the Folsom Post Office.

The Sacramento Regional Transit District extended the light rail train system to Folsom via an extension to the Gold Line in October 2005, providing direct service to Downtown Sacramento.  Regional Transit also operates the Folsom Stage Line, a public bus service within the city of Folsom.

Notable people
Shadrack Biwott, American long-distance runner
Jake Browning, Minnesota Vikings quarterback
Peter Camejo, Green Party activist
Spider Jorgensen, Major League Baseball player
Aspen Ladd, MMA fighter currently fighting in UFC
Brennan Poole, NASCAR driver
Jordan Richards, Baltimore Ravens safety

Education

Folsom Lake College is a public community college which is part of the Los Rios Community College District.

Folsom Cordova Unified School District operates public schools in Folsom and Rancho Cordova. The 3 high schools are Folsom High School, Vista del Lago High School, and Cordova High School. The 4 middle schools are Folsom Middle School, Sutter Middle School, Mills Middle School, and Mitchell Middle School.

The city operates the Folsom Public Library, located in the Georgia Murray Building.

Adjacent areas

Sister cities

 Crespano del Grappa, Italy
  Jiaohe City, China

Arts
 Home to FreeFall Stage, the longest currently running community theatre in the city, established in 2001. (freefallstage.com)
 Home to the Ballet Folsom
 Home to Hawkins School of Performing Arts, the official school of the Ballet Folsom
 Home to The Folsom Symphony
 Home of the Award-winning Folsom High School music program
 Home to the Harris Center for the Arts
 Home to Sutter Street Theatre and the Theatre Production & Technical Academy, located on Sutter Street in the heart of Folsom's Historic District. Sutter Street Theatre in Folsom, CA – Award-Winning Live Theatre Performances In An Intimate 60 Seat Theatre!

See also

 Carpenter Hill
 Folsom State Prison
 Joseph Libbey Folsom

References

External links

Historic Downtown Folsom
Folsom Website - Bike Trails of Folsom 
MyFolsom - Folsom Community Website

 
Cities in Sacramento County, California
Cities in Sacramento metropolitan area
American River (California)
Geography of the Sacramento Valley
Mining communities of the California Gold Rush
1946 establishments in California
Populated places established in 1946
Incorporated cities and towns in California